Canyon High School is a high school in the William S. Hart Union High School District in Canyon Country, Santa Clarita, California.

History
The school opened in September 1968 in three phases at a cost of $3.6 million. It started with five buildings and a library, with administrative offices in portable buildings. C.T. Haan was both the first principal and superintendent of the Hart School District.

Academics

Canyon High School has an academic program with emphasis on preparation for higher education.  All preparatory courses required by the University of California and other institutions of higher learning are offered.

Honors and AP courses are offered in science, mathematics, social studies, foreign languages, and fine arts.  The AVID (Advancement Via Individual Determination) program encourages students from non-academic backgrounds to undertake the college preparatory curriculum and provides them with resources to increase their chance of success in strong academic programs.

Canyon High School supports a Career Paths program which prepares students for careers in theater arts, health science, video production, engineering, and industrial technology.  Students engaged in the Career path programs attend tailored classes and are afford internship opportunities in their chosen fields.  The Career Paths programs ties into the William S. Hart district's Regional Occupational Program (ROP) which offers real-world experiences for students in 30 career fields ranging from forensics to floristry.

Performing arts 
Canyon High has an excellent fine arts department with award-winning choral music, marching band, and theater programs.  The Theatre program at Canyon has excelled in multiple competitions (even placing 1st out of 85 schools in the annual DTASC Competition) and received its own performing arts center in March 2016.

Marching Band
Canyon High School's marching band has six divisions ranging from 1A to 6A.

Athletics
Canyon High School is governed by the California Interscholastic Federation (CIF) Southern Section as a member of the Foothill League. Its athletic mascot is the Cowboy and its colors are hunter green and gold.  Canyon's main rival is William S. Hart High School in Newhall, dating back to 1968. Canyon High School competes in the Foothill League, which also includes Castaic, Golden Valley, Hart, Saugus, West Ranch, and Valencia High Schools.

League Championships:

Football: 1979, 1982, 1983, 1984, 1985, 1987, 1988, 1989, 2005, 2006

Boys Cross Country: 1974, 1980, 1981, 1982, 1987, 1988, 1989, 1990, 1991, 1999, 2000, 2001, 2002, 2003, 2004, 2006

Girls Cross Country: 1991, 1992, 1993, 1995, 1996, 1997, 1998, 1999, 2000, 2001, 2002, 2003, 2004, 2005

Girls Volleyball:  1971, 1972, 1973, 1979, 1980, 1981, 1984, 1985, 1986, 1987, 1988, 1989, 1990, 1991, 1993, 1995, 1997

Boys Basketball: 1978, 1986, 1987, 2001, 2006, 2012

Girls Basketball: 1973, 2010, 2011, 2012, 2013, 2014, 2017, 2018

Boys Soccer: 1991, 1998, 2001, 2003, 2005, 2008, 2009, 2010

Girls Soccer: 1987, 1988, 1991, 1992, 1994, 2002, 2003, 2004, 2005, 2009

Boys Track and Field: 1979, 1981, 1989, 1990, 1991, 1997, 1998, 2000, 2002, 2003, 2004, 2005, 2006, 2007, 2010, 2011, 2012, 2013, 2014, 2015, 2016, 2017, 2018

Girls Track and Field: 1985, 1987, 1996, 1997, 1998, 1999, 2000, 2001, 2002, 2003, 2004, 2005, 2012

Boys Volleyball: 1988, 1989, 1990, 1991, 1996, 1997, 1999, 2000

Baseball: 1980, 1981, 1983, 1984, 2002, 2013

Softball: 1974, 1987, 1993

Boys Tennis: 1979, 1980, 1981, 1986

Boys Golf: 1992

CIF Championships:

Football: 1983, 1984, 1985, 2005, 2006

Girls Cross Country: 1995

Boys Cross Country: 2000, 2001

California State Championships:

Football: 2006

Boys Cross Country: 2001

Girls Cross Country: 1995

Student demographics
As of the 2021-22 school year, 1,959 students were enrolled at Canyon High School, the smallest enrollment among Hart District high schools. Of those, 62.3% were Hispanic, 22.9% were non-Hispanic white, 6.1% were Asian American, and 4.1% were African American. As of 2020-21, 956 students (48.1%) were eligible for free or reduced-price lunch.

Notable alumni
Vanessa Atler - former elite gymnast
Printz Board - Grammy-winning musician, most notably with The Black Eyed Peas
Zach Britton - Major League Baseball pitcher for the New York Yankees
Crystl Bustos - twice Olympic gold medalist on the USA softball team and three times gold medalist at the Pan-American Games.
Fred Cornwell - National Football League tight end (Dallas Cowboys, 1984-85)
Lauren Fleshman - professional track and field athlete and U.S. 5000m champion.
Erik Hiljus - Major League Baseball pitcher
Nate Longshore - college football quarterback, for the California Golden Bears.
Jesse McClure- television personality Storage Hunters, Storage Hunters UK, and British Treasure, American Gold
Kevan Miller - National Hockey League defenseman for the Boston Bruins
Alysia Montaño - US Olympic middle-distance runner
Chuck Osborne - DT NFL 1996-2001. Played at University of Arizona, 1992-96.
Kelly Packard - American actress and television personality
Mohammed Roknipour - professional soccer player for the Los Angeles Blues
Chris Seddon - Major League Baseball pitcher
Keith Smith - former Major League Baseball Shortstop
Cory Snyder - former Major League Baseball utility player
Daryn Tufts - director, writer, and actor. Wrote and directed My Girlfriend's Boyfriend (2010 film) and Inside (2012 American film).
Jane Wells - television personality
Drew Wolitarsky - Canadian Football League wide receiver for the Winnipeg Blue Bombers

References

External links 
School website

Educational institutions established in 1968
Public high schools in California
High schools in Santa Clarita, California
1968 establishments in California